Callitriche cophocarpa is a species of flowering plant native to Europe, Russia, and Northern Africa.

References

cophocarpa
Flora of Africa
Flora of Asia
Flora of Europe
Plants described in 1854